Anjunabeats Worldwide 03 is the third compilation album in the Anjunabeats Worldwide compilation series. It was released in April 2011 on Anjunabeats. The album is mixed and compiled by Russian trance producer Arty and Danish trance producer Daniel Kandi. The compilation is named after the radio show of the same name, which airs every Sunday evening on the internet radio Digitally Imported.

Track listing

References

Electronic compilation albums
2011 compilation albums
Trance compilation albums